Bogside railway station was a railway station serving the north of the town of Irvine, North Ayrshire, Scotland. The station was originally part of the Glasgow, Paisley, Kilmarnock and Ayr Railway (now the Ayrshire Coast Line).

History
The station opened on 23 March 1840. Access was restricted at this station until 1 June 1894 when it became fully open to the public. The station was renamed Bogside Race Course on 30 June 1952, however after the closure of Bogside Racecourse, the station was once again renamed Bogside on 14 June 1965. The station closed permanently to passengers on 2 January 1967.

Gallery

References

Notes

Sources 
 

Disused railway stations in North Ayrshire
Railway stations in Great Britain opened in 1840
Railway stations in Great Britain closed in 1967
Beeching closures in Scotland
Former Glasgow and South Western Railway stations
Irvine, North Ayrshire